This is a list of notable Minnan Hokkiens/Hoklos (河洛人). Unless otherwise noted, locations noted are of ancestral locations in Southern Fujian, China.

Academia and Science

Su Song (蘇頌/苏颂, 1020–1101 AD; Tong'an district, Quanzhou city) - renown polymath, scientist, mathematician and mechanical engineer of the Song Dynasty
Lim Boon Keng (林文慶, 1869–1957; ancestry: Longhai, Zhangzhou), first Singaporean to receive a Queen's Scholarship and advocated social and educational reforms in Singapore in the early 20th-century, also served as president of Xiamen University (1921-1937)
Li Denghui (educator) (李登輝, Tong'an District, Fujian) Born in Batavia, Indonesia, 1873. First President of the famous Fudan University of Shanghai.
Su Buqing (蘇步青/苏步青, born 1902 in Pingyang County, Wenzhou, Zhejiang - 2003; ancestry: Quanzhou City) - mathematician and president of Fudan University.
Cai Liusheng (蔡镏生, born 18 September 1902, Quanzhou, Fujian). Academician of the Chinese Academy of Sciences. He was one of the founders of catalytic kinetics in China.
Wang Yinglai (王應睞/王应睐, 13 Nov 1907; Kinmen island) - Chinese biochemist recognized as the first person to create synthetic insulin
Cai Qirui (蔡啟瑞/蔡启瑞, 7 Jan 1914; Xiamen city) - the founder of Chinese catalytic chemistry
Xie Xide (謝希德/谢希德; 1921 – 2000, Quanzhou in Fujian) also known as Hilda Hsieh. Prominent Chinese physicist, president of Fudan University from 1983 to 1989, and remained as advisor to the university from 1989 until her death. She helped to set up the university's Centre for American Studies and founded its Modern Physics Institute in 1977. Referred to as someone the Nobel prize committee missed
Peng Shilu (彭士禄, 18 Nov 1925 – 22 Mar 2021; Haifeng, Shanwei city, Guangdong) - Nuclear engineer, Hailed the "Father of China's nuclear submarines".
Huang Zhanyue  (黄展岳), Born	August 1926, Nan'an, Fujian. Prominent Chinese archaeologist and Professor at the Institute of Archaeology, Chinese Academy of Social Sciences. Research focus was on the archaeology of China from the Han dynasty to the Tang dynasty.
Sow-Hsin Chen (陳守信/陈守信, born 1935 in Chiayi, Taiwan) - physicist and professor emeritus at Massachusetts Institute of Technology (MIT), a recognized pioneer in the research of dynamic properties of supercooled and interfacial water
Leon Chua (蔡少棠, born June 28, 1936, in the Philippines; ancestral: Jinjiang, Quanzhou) - computer scientist, professor at the University of California, Berkeley and the inventor of the Chua's circuit.
Zhong Nanshan (鐘南山/钟南山; ancestral home in Xiamen, born 1936 in Nanjing) Top epidemiologist, pulmonologist adviser to the Chinese government during the SARS and COVID-19 pandemics. Recipient of Order of the Republic, the highest order of honor of China. Named by Time magazine as one of the 100 most influential people in the world in 2020.
Yuan T. Lee or (Yuan Tseh Lee, 李遠哲,  ancestral: Nan'an City, Quanzhou) - Nobel Prize winner in Chemistry in 1986.
Lin Junde (林俊德, 13 March 1938, Yongchun County, Quanzhou) -  Explosion Mechanics scientist and Researcher at Xinjiang Malan Nuclear Test Base. Honored as one of the "Ten People Who Moved China".
Zhijian Chen (陳志堅/陈志坚) (born 1966; Anxi, Quanzhou) - a biochemist and professor at University of Texas Southwestern Medical Center, recipient of the 2019 Breakthrough Prize in Life Sciences
Fang Zhouzi (方舟子, Sep 28, 1967; Yunxiao County, Zhangzhou) - postdoctoral researcher in molecular genetics and Chinese popular science writer.
March Tian Boedihardjo (沈詩鈞/沈诗钧) (born March 1998 in Hong Kong; ancestry: Anxi, Quanzhou) - a mathematics child genius he was enrolled in a university at only 9 years old graduating one year early, became a mathematics professor at 18
Xie Hua'an (谢华安) of (Longyan, Fujian). Chinese agronomist best known for developing the hybrid rice "Shan-You 63" which is a milestone for China's hybrid rice development and production because of its high yield, disease resistance, excellent rice quality and wide adaptability.
Lin Qiaozhi or Kha-Ti Lim  (林巧稚) of (Xiamen, Fujian). One of China's most prominent obstetrician and gynecologist.
Lu Jiaxi (chemist) (卢嘉锡) of Xiamen, Fujian. The physical chemist who is considered a founder of the discipline in China. In 1998, the asteroid 3844 Lujiaxi was named in his honor.

Business
 Li Dan (李旦; died 1625; ancestry: Quanzhou), prominent early 17th century Chinese merchant and political figure in Japan, became part of the shuinsen trade, with a formal vermillion seal license from the Tokugawa shogunate
 Wu Bingjian (伍秉鑑; 1769–1843; ancestry:  Jinjiang, Quanzhou), known as Howqua in the West, the "Richest man in the world" during his time, 19th century Qing dynasty. Single-handedly contributed a third of the three million dollars that the Qing government was required to pay the British as stipulated in the Treaty of Nanking, (First Opium War) 1842.
 Kiong Kong Tuan (龔光傳; 1790–1854), Penang Hokkien merchant who was the last opium farmer in Singapore.
 Kan Keng Tjong (1797—1871; ancestry: Zhangzhou), Chinese-Indonesian tycoon and one of the richest men in Batavia, capital of the Dutch East Indies
 Chan Mah Phee (曾廣庇; 1848; ancestry: Tong'an, Xiamen), businessman, land-owner, investor and philanthropist who founded numerous successful ventures in Yangon, Burma. He had built Chan Mah Phee hospital in Ahlon and Chan Ma Phee hall of Shwedagon Pagoda was named in recognition of his patronage and support
 Koo Hsien-jung (辜顯榮; 1866–1937; ancestry: Hui'an, Quanzhou),  businessman and politician who enjoyed strong links to the colonial administration of Taiwan under Japanese rule. He founded the Koos Group of companies, the largest business group in Taiwan.
 Tan Kah Kee (陈嘉庚; 1874–1961; ancestry: Jimei, Xiamen), Singapore Chinese businessman, philanthropist and prominent figure in the overseas Chinese community. Donated most of his assets and earnings to aid China in major events such as Xinhai Revolution (1911), the Second Sino-Japanese War (1937–45) and establishing numerous schools in China and South East Asia. He is also the founder of The Xiamen University, Fujian Province. 
 Neo Ao Tiew (梁後宙; 1884–1975; ancestry: Nan'an, Quanzhou), Chinese businessman, philanthropist and community leader, best known for developing the Lim Chu Kang area of Singapore. 
 Lee Choon Seng (李俊成; 1888–1966; ancestry: Yongchun, Quanzhou), prominent businessman, philanthropist and lay Buddhist leader. He started several local Chinese banks, including Ho Hong Bank which eventually merged with two other banks to form the Oversea-Chinese Banking Corporation (OCBC). 
 Dee Ching Chuan (李清泉; 1888–1940; ancestry: Jinjiang, Quanzhou) businessman, philanthropist, and activist known as the Philippines "Lumber King" during the American colonial rule, also founded China Banking Corporation (China Bank) in 1920.
 Lee Kong Chian (李光前; 1893–1967; ancestry: Nan'an, Quanzhou), One of the richest men in Southeast Asia in the 1950s and 1960s. He poured his wealth into education and other philanthropic work, and eventually set up Lee Foundation for charitable purpose.
 Tan Lark Sye (陳六使; 1897–1972; ancestry: Jimei, Xiamen), prominent businessman and philanthropist, became one of the leading rubber industrialists of the region in the 1950s. He initiated the founding of Nanyang University in 1953 and donated S$5 million to its building fund, as well as 523 acres of land for its campus on behalf of Singapore Hokkien Huay Kuan. 
 Tan Chin Tuan (陈振传; 1908–2005), Peranakan banker and philanthropist often credited with helping to establish the OCBC Bank.
 Go Peh-hok (吳百福; 1910–2007), also known as Momofuku Ando, inventor and businessman born in Imperial Japanese Taiwan who founded Nissin Food Products Co., Ltd. He is also the inventor of instant noodles and the creator of the brands, Top Ramen and Cup Noodles.
 Kwek Hong Png (郭芳楓; 1913–1994; ancestry: Tong'an, Xiamen), entrepreneur and founder of Hong Leong Group.
 Khoo Teck Puat (邱德拔; 1917–2004; ancestry: Haicang, Xiamen), founder of Malayan Banking, largest single shareholder of the British bank Standard Chartered and owned the Goodwood Group.
 Wang Yung-ching (王永慶; 1917–2008; ancestry: Anxi, Quanzhou), Taiwanese entrepreneur who founded a large business empire, Forbes ranked him as the 178th richest person worldwide in 2008.
 Lim Goh Tong (林梧桐; 1918–2007; ancestry: Anxi, Quanzhou), prominent wealthy businessman & entrepreneur, who founded the Genting Group in Malaysia and donated most scenic site of Genting Highlands to built Chin Swee Caves Temple
 Lau Gim Kok (劉錦國；1920–2018; ancestry: Kinmen) Bruneian businessman who founded Hua Ho, a well-known local supermarket and department store chain as well as an agricultural farm in Brunei.
 Henry Sy (施振榮; 1924–2019; ancestry:  Jinjiang, Quanzhou), the richest man in the Philippines (named by Forbes in 2015).
 Wee Cho Yaw (黃祖耀; born 1929; ancestry: Kinmen island) - billionaire businessman and the chairman of the United Overseas Bank (UOB) and United Industrial Corporation (UIC) in Singapore.
 Lucio Tan (陳永栽; born 1934; ancestry:  Jinjiang, Quanzhou), Filipino businessman and philanthropist, owner of the Philippine National Bank, and chairman and CEO of Philippine Airlines and the Lucio Tan Group of Companies which owns many of the country's distilleries.
 Robert Budi (黃惠忠; born 1940 in Semarang, Java, Indonesia) and Michael Bambang Hartono (黃輝祥; born 1939 in Kudus, Indonesia) - brothers, the richest persons in Indonesia.
 Tony Tan Caktiong (陳覺中; born 1953; ancestry: Jinjiang, Quanzhou), founder and chairman of Jollibee Foods Corporation and the co-chairman of DoubleDragon Properties.
 Sim Wong Hoo (沈望傅; born 1955; ancestry: Zhao'an, Zhangzhou) - the founder, CEO and chairman of Creative Technology.
 Pua Khein-Seng (潘健成; born 1974; ancestry: Yongchun, Quanzhou), the inventor of the USB flash drive and CEO of Phison Electronics Corporation in Taiwan.

Monarchs

Min kingdom(閩王國), China
Empress Dowager Huang, (黃太后 / 龍啟太后, Quanzhou, Fujian)
Liu Congxiao, Prince of Jinjiang.
Liu Shaozi, king warlord.

House of Koxinga (東寧王國), China
Koxinga
Zheng Jing
Zheng Keshuang

Lý dynasty (李朝), Đại Việt
Lý Thái Tổ
Lý Thái Tông
Lý Thánh Tông
Lý Nhân Tông

Public Office and Politicians
 Ancient China
Huang Daozhou (黃道周, 1585–1646; Zhangzhou, Fujian), obtained the degree of Jinshi in 1622. He subsequently held various government positions, including Minister for Education during the Ming dynasty. Killed by the Manchu invaders for refusing to surrender.
Hong Chengchou (洪承疇; 1593–1665; Nan'an, Quanzhou), Chinese official under the Ming and Qing dynasties
Li Guangdi (李光地; 1642–1718; Anxi, Quanzhou), Prominent Qing dynasty court official during Emperor KangXi's reign.
Shi Shilun (施世綸; 1659–1722; Jinjiang, Quanzhou), a much-praised Qing dynasty official during the Kangxi Emperor's reign and was the son of general Shi Lang.

 Mainland China
Chen Boda (陈伯达; 1904–1989) (Hui'an, Quanzhou), close associate of Mao Zedong, chairing the Cultural Revolution Group 
Chen Jiongming (陳炯明; 1878–1933; Haifeng county), governor of Guangdong and Guangxi during the Republic of China period.
Xu Kunlin (许昆林) of Yongchun County, Fujian.  Governor of Jiangsu Province
Liu Cigui, (刘赐贵) of Quanzhou, Fujian. Communist Party Secretary of Hainan province. His former positions include Governor of Hainan, Director of the State Oceanic Administration and China Coast Guard.
Zheng Shanjie, (郑栅洁) of Zhangzhou, Fujian.  Communist Party Secretary of Anhui Province and formerly served as the Governor and Deputy Party Secretary of Zhejiang.

 Republic of China(Taiwan)
Chen Shui-bian (陳水扁; 1950 ; ancestry: Zhao'an, Zhangzhou), 5th President of the Republic of China 
Vincent Siew  (蕭萬長); Vice President of the Republic of China from 2008 to 2012. He was the first Taiwanese-born Premier of the Republic of China and former vice-chairman of the Kuomintang (KMT).
Wu Den-yih (吳敦義). Vice President of the Republic of China, 2012 to 2016. Premier of the Republic of China, 2009 – 2012. Chairman of the Kuomintang (KMT), 2017- 2020.
Lai Ching-te (賴淸德; 1959; ancestry: Zhangzhou), the Vice President of the Republic of China since 2020
Chang Chun-hsiung (張俊雄).  Served as Premier of the Republic of China twice, 2000- 2002 and 2007–2008.
Hsieh Chang-ting (謝長廷; 1946; ancestry: Dongshan, Zhangzhou), politician and former defense attorney, was Premier of Taiwan and mayor of Kaohsiung City
Wang Jin-pyng (王金平). President of the Legislative Yuan from 1999 to 2016, longest-serving legislative speaker.
Lai In-jaw (賴英照) President of the Judicial Yuan 2007- 2012, Vice Premier of the Republic of China 2000 – 2002 and Chief Justice of the Constitutional Court of the Republic of China.

 Vietnam
Phan Thanh Giản (潘清簡; 1796–1867; Haicheng, Zhangzhou), the Grand Counsellor of the Nguyễn Dynasty in Vietnam.

 Indonesia
Han Siong Kong (Born 1673 in Tianbao, Zhangzhou, Fujian) Founder of the Han family of Lasem, the Chinese gentry (baba bangsawan) which has played significant roles as bureaucrats and politicians in the Dutch colonial Indonesia.
Khouw Tjoen the founder of the Khouw family of Tamboen, one of the most prominent dynasties of the 'Tjabang Atas' or Chinese gentry of colonial Indonesia.
Khouw Kim An (許金安; 1875–1945) served as the fifth and last Majoor der Chinezen ("Major of the Chinese") of Batavia in Dutch East Indies and belonged to the Khouw family of Tamboen
Loa Sek Hie Indonesian-Chinese colonial politician, parliamentarian and founding Voorzitter or chairman of the Indon ethnic-Chinese self-defense force Pao An Tui (1946–1949)
Kwik Kian Gie (郭建義). Coordinating Minister of Economics and Finance from 1999 to 2000, and Minister of National Development Planning from 2001 to 2004.

 Thailand
Chuan Leekpai (呂基文; 28 Jul 1938; ancestry: Nan'an City, Quanzhou), Served twice as Prime Minister of Thailand.
Kittiratt Na-Ranong or Khaw Cheng Thong (1958), Deputy Prime Minister of Thailand,  Aug 2011 – May 2014 and Finance Minister (great-great-grandson of Khaw Soo Cheang)
Khaw Soo Cheang, Governor of Ranong Province, Thailand in 1854 and given the princely title of Phraya Na Ranong by the Thai royal family. He became primogenitor of the Khaw na Ranong family
Khaw Sim Bee or Phraya Ratsadanupradit Mahitsaraphakdi (許心美; 1857–1913; ancestry: Zhangzhou), the governor of Trang Province in Thailand.
Mongkol Na Songkhla (1941–2020), Health Minister of Thailand (2006 - 2008).
Korn Chatikavanij (1964), Finance Minister of Thailand (2008-2011)

 Philippines
Tan Quien Sien (陳謙善; 1844–1901; ancestry: Tong'an, Xiamen), served as gobernadorcillo who helped funding the establishment of the Chinese General Hospital in 1891 and it was also through his efforts that Manila Chinese Cemetery & Chong Hock Tong Temple were established
Sergio Osmeña (吳文钊; 1878–1961;  Jinjiang, Quanzhou), 4th President of the Philippines, son of Go Bon Tiao or Pedro Lee Gotiaoco.
Corazon Aquino (許寰哥; 1933–2009; ancestry: Jiaomei, Fujian), 11th President of the Philippines.
Rodrigo Duterte (Ancestry from Xiamen, Fujian), 16th President of the Philippines.
José Rizal (Ancestry from Xiamen, Fujian), Freedom fighter and considered the national hero (pambansang bayani) of the Philippines.
Román Ongpin. Filipino-Chinese businessman and philanthropist who aided Filipino revolutionaries against the Spanish and American colonial administration in the Philippine islands
Claudio Teehankee. The 16th Chief Justice of the Supreme Court of the Philippines from 1987 to 1988

 Singapore
Tan Tock Seng (陳篤生; 1798–1850; ancestry: Zhangzhou), served as acting Kapitan China of Singapore (government-appointed head of the Chinese community) and founder of Tan Tock Seng Hospital.
Tan Kim Ching (陳金鐘; 1829–1892; ancestry: Zhangzhou), served as Kapitan China of the Chinese community, was also the consul for Japan, Siam and Russia, and was a member of the Royal Court of Siam.
Tan Kim Seng (陳金聲; 1805–1864; ancestry: Yongchun, Quanzhou), Chinese community leader (Hokkien) and first magistrate of Chinese descent in Singapore
Ong Eng Guan (王永元; 1925–2008), first and only duly elected Mayor of Singapore
Wee Kim Wee (黃金輝; 1915–2005; ancestry: Longhai, Zhangzhou), 4th President of Singapore
Ong Teng Cheong (王鼎昌; 1936–2002), 5th President of Singapore
Tan Keng Yam Tony (陳慶炎; 1940; ancestry: Xiamen), 7th President of Singapore
Goh Chok Tong (吳作棟; 1941; ancestry: Yongchun, Quanzhou), the 2nd Prime Minister of Singapore
Goh Keng Swee (吳慶瑞; 1918–2010) 2nd Deputy Prime Minister of Singapore
Wee Chong Jin (黄宗仁) The first chief justice of Singapore.
Lim Yew Hock (林有福, ancestry from Kinmen, Fujian)  Served as the second and last Chief Minister of Colonial Singapore between 1956 and 1959.

 Malaysia
Tan Cheng Lock (陳禎祿; 1883–1960; ancestry: Zhangzhou), one of the founding fathers of modern-day Malaysia, along with Tunku Abdul Rahman and the founder, first president of the Malayan Chinese Association
Tan Siew Sin (陳修信; 1916–1988; ancestry: Zhangzhou), longest-serving Finance Minister in Malaysia (1961–1974) and the son of Tun Dato' Sir Tan Cheng Lock
Lim Chong Eu (林蒼祐; 1919–2010; ancestry: Tong'an, Xiamen), Malaysian politician who served as the 2nd Chief Minister of Penang
Lim Kit Siang (林吉祥 ; 1941; ancestry: Dongshan, Zhangzhou) Longest serving Opposition Leader of Malaysia.
Lim Keng Yaik (林敬益; 1939–2012; ancestry: Anxi, Quanzhou), Malaysian politician and former Minister of Energy, Water and Communications
Koh Tsu Koon (許子根; 1949; ancestry: Xiamen), Malaysian politician who served as the 3rd Chief Minister of Penang (1990-2008)
Lim Guan Eng (林冠英; 1960; ancestry: Dongshan, Zhangzhou), Malaysian politician who served as the 4th Chief Minister of Penang and was also Minister of Finance. Son of Lim Kit Siang
Yeo Bee Yin (杨美盈; 1983) Minister of Energy, Science, Technology, Environment and Climate Change.

 Myanmar
Aung Gyi (陈旺枝), Burmese military officer and politician. He was a cofounder of the National League for Democracy and served as president of the party but left to form a rival party,  the Union National Democracy Party.  He was the number two in the Union Revolutionary Council set up after the 1962 coup, serving as vice-chief of staff and minister of trade and industry.
Tan Yu Sai (陳裕才), one of the founding members of the Union Revolutionary Council from 2 March 1962 to 6 October 1970, and also serbved as the Minister for Trade.

 Hong Kong
 Yeoh Eng-kiong OBE, GBS, JP (楊永強). Malaysian born. Served as Secretary for Health and Welfare 1999 - 2002, Secretary for Health, Welfare and Food and member of the Executive Council 2002 - 2004 in the Hong Kong Government.

 Canada
John Yap (葉志明; 1959), Minister of State for Climate Action of British Columbia in Canada

Military
Zheng Zhilong (鄭芝龍; 1604–1661), Marquis of Tong'an and Nan'an, political and military leader in the late Ming dynasty who defeated the Dutch during the Battle of Liaoluo Bay
Shi Lang, (	施琅; 1621–1696; Jinjiang, Quanzhou). Commander-in-chief of the Qing fleets which defeated Kingdom of Tungning and conquered Taiwan in 1683.
José Ignacio Paua  (刘亨赙, Nan'an, Quanzhou, Fujian) Chinese-Filipino general who joined the Katipunan that spearheaded the 1896 Philippine Revolution against the Spanish Empire. Continued to fight against the Americans during the Philippine–American War.
Ye Fei  (葉飛, Nan'an, Quanzhou) or Sixto Mercado Tiongco was a Philippine-born Chinese military general and politician of the People's Republic of China. Served at various times as Commander-in-Chief of the Chinese Navy, Governor & Communist Party Chief of Fujian Province and  Minister of Transport.
Cai Yingting (蔡英挺, Jinjiang, Quanzhou), ex-commander of Nanjing Military Region, ex-president of the PLA Academy of Military Science
John Lie (Indonesian Navy officer).  A National Hero of Indonesia, was one of the first high-ranking navy commanders during the Indonesian National Revolution.
Vicente Lim, Filipino brigadier general and World War II hero.

Arts & Entertainment

Authors/Writers
Lauw Giok Lan (劉玉蘭; 1883–1953), Indonesian journalist, writer and one of the founders of the newspaper Sin Po
Thio Tjin Boen (張振文; 1885–1940), Indonesian writer of Malay-language fiction and a journalist
Kwee Tek Hoay (郭德懷; 1886–1951), Indonesian writer of novels and drama, important proponent of Tri-Dharma and credited with the publication of Dharma Moestika (1932–1934) and a list of publications

Movie directors

Tang Xiaodan (汤晓丹; 22 Feb 1910, Hua'an, Zhangzhou), Chinese film director. In 1984, he won the Golden Rooster Award for Best Director.
Jack Neo (梁志強), Singapore film and television actor, host and director.
Eric Khoo (邱金海; born 27 March 1965) credited for the revival of Singapore's film industry, youngest son of Khoo Teck Puat.
Boo Junfeng (巫俊锋, 4 Dec 1983), Singapore filmmaker.

Singers

 Jay Chou (周杰倫, born 18 January 1979 in Linkou District, Taiwan), renowned Taiwanese singer.
 Goh Kiat Chun (Wu Chun) (吳尊; born 10 October 1979 in Brunei; ancestry: Lieyu, Kinmen), actor, singer, model and was a member of Fahrenheit, a Taiwanese Mandopop vocal quartet boy band
JJ Lin (林俊杰, born 27 March 1981 in Singapore; ancestry: Kinmen), singer, songwriter, record producer, and actor
Yin Chengzong (殷承宗; born 1941 in Gulangyu, Xiamen), pianist and composer.
 Dick Lee (李迪文, born 24 August 1956 in Singapore), pop singer, composer and playwright.
 Wu Bai (吳俊霖, born 14 January 1968 in Chiayi, Taiwan), rock singer and songwriter.
 Jody Chiang (江蕙), Taiwan's most famous singer and is often referred to as the Queen of Taiwanese pop music.
 Janet Hsieh (謝怡芬), a Taiwanese-American television personality, violinist, author, and model based in Taipei, Taiwan. She is most well known for playing the Taiwanese Mandarin voiceover of Anna in the movie Frozen.
 Han Kuo-Huang (韩国璜), a Chinese-born American musician.
 Tan Kheng Seong (Ah Niu) (陳慶祥; born 31 August 1976 in Malaysia; ancestry: Nan'an, Quanzhou), Malaysian Chinese singer in Malaysia and Singapore

Actors/Actresses

 Michelle Yeoh (楊紫瓊,Ipoh, Malaysia) - a Chinese Malaysian actress, best known for performing her own stunts in the Hong Kong action films that brought her to fame in the early 1990s.
 Ko Chun-hsiung (柯俊雄). Winner of three Golden Horse Awards, two Asia Pacific Film Festival Awards for Best Actor, a Panama International Film Festival Award for Best Actor.
 Richard Ng Man-tat (吳孟達), Famous Hong Kong actor, 	Winner of the Best Supporting Actor award 1990, Hong Kong Film Awards 
 Chen Sung-young (陳松勇). Winner of the Golden Horse Award for Best Actor in 1989
 Sarah Lian (连丽婷), a Chinese Malaysian actress and television personality based in Kuala Lumpur, Malaysia.
 Yao Chen (姚晨), a Chinese actress whom Forbes ranks as the 83rd most powerful woman in the world
 Lim Kay Tong (林祺堂), Singaporean actor
 Sharon Au, former Singaporean actress and host
 Priscelia Chan (曾詩梅), Singaporean television actress
 Tan Kok Hwa (陳國華), Singaporean actor
 Jeanette Aw (欧燕苹), named as one of the Seven Princesses of Mediacorp.
 Edmund Chen (陈之财), Singaporean actor
 Paige Chua (蔡琦慧), Singaporean model and actress
 Baiyu (singer), Chinese-born American singer-songwriter and actress.
 Angelababy

Sports

Huang Dongping (黄东萍 ; Nan'an, Fujian, China) Tokyo 2020 Olympics Gold medalist for badminton mixed doubles.
Yang Liwan, (Shishi, Quanzhou, China) Multiple Paralympic and World Championship Gold medals winner for shot put and javelin.
Rudy Hartono Kurniawan (梁海量), born Nio Hap Liang in Surabaya, Indonesia. Badminton player who won the men's singles title at the prestigious All-England Championship eight times, seven times consecutively (1968–1974) and at World Championship in 1980. Widely acclaimed as the greatest badminton player of all time. 
Lee Chong Wei (李宗偉), born in  Penang, Malaysia.  No.1 World ranking Badminton player for a total of 349 weeks, including a 199-week streak from 21 August 2008 to 14 June 2012.
Goh Jin Wei, (吴堇溦) is a Malaysian badminton player. Gold medalist (girls' singles) at the 2015 and 2018 BWF World Junior Championships, 2018 Youth Olympics and 2017 Southeast Asian Games.
Tan Boon Heong, (陈文宏) is a former World No.1 Malaysian professional badminton player in the men's doubles event. Won multiple Gold medals in the doubles events of the World junior Championships, Commonwealth Games and Asian Games.
Maria Fransisca  or (Tjan So Gwan; 曾素光), is an Indonesian badminton player who won multiple gold medals in the World Masters Games, World Senior Championships and Southeast Asian Games.
 Ivana Lie Ing Hoa (李英華). Indonesian badminton player who won gold medals in the World Cup, Asian Games and the Southeast Asian games.
 Hiong Liong Tan or Tan Hoan Liong or H.L Tan (陈香良). He was the first Indonesian and one of the first Asian chess players to hold the International Master title.
Ang Peng Siong (洪秉祥), Swimmer from Singapore, who once held World Number 1 ranking in the 50 m freestyle. Gold medalist 100 m freestyle, Asian Games 1982 New Delhi

Religion
 Master Qingshui (清水祖師; 1047–1101; ancestry: Yongchun, Quanzhou), formerly known as Chen Zhaoyin (陳昭應), famous Chan Buddhist monk during the Northern Song dynasty and was eventually worship as Chinese Deity in Southern Fujian, Taiwan and among Hokkien-speaking Chinese diaspora communities
Venerable Zhuan Dao (轉道法師; 1871–1943), Singapore Buddhist leader and Founder of the KMSPKS
Buddhādasa Bhikkhu (佛使比丘; 1906–1993), Prominent Thai Buddhist Reformer, and influential Thai ascetic-philosopher of the 20th century.
Venerable Hong Choon (宏船法師; 1907–1990; ancestry: Jinjiang, Quanzhou), Singapore Buddhist leader and 2nd president of SBF

References

 
Lists of people by ethnicity